These are the results of the 2022 Johor state election. The elections was held in Johor on 12 March 2022.

Map

Full result

https://lom.agc.gov.my/ilims/upload/portal/akta/outputp/1726069/PUB166_2022.pdf

References 

2022
2022 elections in Malaysia
2022 in Malaysia
Election results in Malaysia